Jean-Pierre Lacombe-Saint-Michel, born 5 March 1751 and died 27 January 1812 in the château de Saint-Michel-de-Vax (Tarn), was a French general in the French Revolutionary and Napoleonic armies.

He appeared as a character in Les Géorgiques by the novelist Claude Simon, his direct descendant. During the French Revolution he protected Bernard-François Balssa (1746-1829), father of Honoré de Balzac; Balssa’s younger brother Jean had married his first cousin Marie-Brigitte Lacombe de Blanchefort in 1777.

Revolution 
Starting as an artillery cadet in 1765, Jean-Pierre Lacombe-Saint-Michel became a second lieutenant in the Toul regiment in 1767, gunnery captain in 1779, and mortar captain in 1786. Pierre Choderlos de Laclos was his captain-major at this time. In 1789, he took part in the storming of the Bastille, but as marshal de Broglie did not have confidence in him he was sent back to Tarn, where he was elected to an administrative post. In 1782 he married Marie Anne d’Hasselaër, by whom he had a son. His first wife died in January 1790.

He was first a member of the military committee of the Assembly, and was then re-elected as député to the Convention. He was sent to Savoy, together with Gasparin and Dubois-Crancé le to dismiss general de Montesquiou-Fézensac. On his return, he voted for the death of the king (though later in 1793 he remarried, to Marie Micoud, a courageous woman who had tied to save the king from the guillotine and had been imprisoned at the beginning of the year).

Next he was sent to Corsica, where he arrived on 6 April 1793 and manage to defeat Pasquale Paoli at the battle of Farinole. Wounded in the battle, he was made général de brigade on 17 November 1793, two days after his victory. He was on mission with the Army of the North when Robespierre fell. On 13 Thermidor Year II (31 July 1793) he wrote to the Committee of Public Safety “By attacking the treacherous coalition that I will search out Robespierre’s accomplices.” On his return to Paris in February 1795, he became a member of the Committee himself.

Directory
He was elected to the Council of Ancients by Tarn, as well as by Nord and Orne. He supported the Directory and the Coup of 18 Fructidor (4 September 1797). With the rank of Divisional General when he completed his term on the Council on 13 February 1798, Lacombe-Saint-Michel was sent to Naples, but spoke in such an undiplomatic and pro-Republican way to Ferdinand I of the Two Sicilies that he was asked to leave the kingdom. His ship was seized by pirates from Tunis, but Hammuda Pasha set him free. On his return to France in January 1799, he was given command of the artillery in the Army of the Rhine.

Consulate and Empire
From 1800 to 1805 Napoleon placed him in charge of artillery for the Army of Italy. He was made Grand Officer of the Légion d’honneur on 27 July 1808. He saw further action in Hannover and Catalonia, where he commanded the 10th division before being appointed governor of Barcelona in 1810. During his brief term of office he established a Commission for the Arts and Sciences to assemble a library of all the collections from religious houses that had been suppressed. In August 1810 poor health ended his career, after seventeen campaigns, and he was replaced as governor by Maurice Matthieu.

References

1751 births
1812 deaths
People on the Committee of Public Safety
Regicides of Louis XVI
Members of the Legislative Assembly (France)
French Republican military leaders of the French Revolutionary Wars
People from Tarn (department)
Members of the Council of Five Hundred
French commanders of the Napoleonic Wars